Yelena Valeryevna Ovchinnikova (born 17 July 1982 in Moscow) is a Russian competitor in synchronized swimming. She won a gold medal in team competition at the 2008 Summer Olympics.
Now She Is Presenter For The Voice Of Russia

References
 The Official Website of the Beijing 2008 Olympic Games

Living people
Olympic gold medalists for Russia
Russian synchronized swimmers
Olympic synchronized swimmers of Russia
Synchronized swimmers at the 2008 Summer Olympics
1982 births
Swimmers from Moscow
Olympic medalists in synchronized swimming
Medalists at the 2008 Summer Olympics